Nemah is an unincorporated community in Pacific County, in the U.S. state of Washington, lying on the mainland bordering Willapa Bay.

History
A post office called Nemah was established in 1894, and remained in operation until 1923. The origin of the name Nemah is obscure.

The area is a popular hunting grounds for wild elk.

References

Unincorporated communities in Pacific County, Washington
Unincorporated communities in Washington (state)